Douglas Baggio de Oliveira Costa (born 2 February 1995) is a Brazilian footballer who plays as striker for Grêmio Novorizontino.

Club career

Flamengo
Douglas Baggio began his career with Flamengo, joining the youth side in 2010. Following his promising performances for the club in tournaments at under-17 level, which saw him score an impressive 72 goals in 2012, he was subsequently promoted to the senior team, and was also linked with several major European clubs in the media. He made his debut for the senior team on 16 March 2014, in a 2–2 draw with Bangu. In 2015, he signed a new contract extension with the club, which would see him remain with the team until 2017.

Luverdense (First loan)
After struggling to find space in the Flamengo first team, in February 2016, Douglas Baggio was sent on loan to Série B side Luverdense in order to gain playing time.

Ceará (loan)
On 22 December 2016 Ceará signed Douglas for a one-year loan until the end of 2017.

Luverdense (Second loan)
After a brief loan spell with Ceará, Douglas returned to Luverdense on loan for a second time in 2017.

Mirassol
In January 2018, after his contract with Flamengo had expired, Douglas Baggio was signed by Mirassol.

Boa Esporte
In April 2018 Douglas Baggio joined Boa Esporte to play in 2018 Campeonato Brasileiro Série B. He featured in thirty games, scoring three times.

Brasil de Pelotas
Douglas Baggio joined Grêmio Esportivo Brasil for the 2019 season.

Style of play
Regarded as a promising young striker, Douglas Baggio is known for his speed, technique, and eye for goal. His main influences as a footballer are Cristiano Ronaldo and Willian.

Personal life
Douglas Baggio is named after Italian former footballer Roberto Baggio. In an interview, he explained the reason behind his name, commenting that his father, while watching the 1994 World Cup Final penalty shoot-out between Brazil and Italy, reportedly stated that if Italy's final penalty taker – Baggio – were to miss his kick, then he would name his son after him; Baggio kicked the ball over the bar, which resulted in Brazil winning the World Cup, and a year later, Douglas Baggio was born.

Career statistics

Club

Honours
Flamengo
 Campeonato Carioca: 2014

Ceará
 Campeonato Cearense: 2017

Luverdense
 Copa Verde: 2017
 Campeonato Mato-Grossense: 2016

References

External links

1995 births
Living people
People from Jaboatão dos Guararapes
Brazilian footballers
Association football forwards
Campeonato Brasileiro Série A players
Campeonato Brasileiro Série B players
Campeonato Brasileiro Série C players
Campeonato Brasileiro Série D players
CR Flamengo footballers
Ceará Sporting Club players
Luverdense Esporte Clube players
Mirassol Futebol Clube players
Boa Esporte Clube players
Grêmio Esportivo Brasil players
Goiás Esporte Clube players
Grêmio Novorizontino players
Sportspeople from Pernambuco
21st-century Brazilian people